Balla Dièye (born 13 November 1980) is a Senegalese taekwondo athlete.

He competed at the 2016 Summer Olympics in Rio de Janeiro, in the men's 68 kg, where he lost to Karol Robak in the preliminaries.

In 2017, he competed in the men's featherweight event at the 2017 World Taekwondo Championships held in Muju, South Korea.

References

External links

1980 births
Living people
Senegalese male taekwondo practitioners
Olympic taekwondo practitioners of Senegal
Taekwondo practitioners at the 2016 Summer Olympics
African Games medalists in taekwondo
Universiade medalists in taekwondo
African Games silver medalists for Senegal
Competitors at the 2015 African Games
Universiade medalists for Senegal
20th-century Senegalese people
21st-century Senegalese people